The 1933 Wentworth by-election was held on 22 December 1933.  The by-election was held due to the death of the incumbent Labour MP, George Henry Hirst.  It was won by the Labour candidate Wilfred Paling.

References

1933 in England
Elections in Rotherham
1933 elections in the United Kingdom
By-elections to the Parliament of the United Kingdom in South Yorkshire constituencies
Unopposed by-elections to the Parliament of the United Kingdom (need citation)
1930s in Yorkshire